Upham is a surname, and may refer to

 Alexander Upham (1802–1841), farmer, merchant, ship builder and political figure in Nova Scotia, Canada
 Alfred H. Upham (1877–1945), president of Miami University from 1928
 Alonzo S. Upham (1811–1882), New York politician
 Bill Upham (1888–1959), American baseball player
 Calvin H. Upham (1828–1892), American politician in Wisconsin
 Charles Upham (1908–1994), New Zealand soldier, most decorated Commonwealth soldier in WW2
 Charles W. Upham (1802–1875), historian and U.S. Representative from Massachusetts
 Daniel Phillips Upham (1832–1882), Republican politician and Arkansas State Militia commander
 Don A. J. Upham (1809–1877), American lawyer and Wisconsin politician
 Edward Upham (1776–1834), antiquarian and orientalist
 Ernest Upham (1873–1935), New Zealand cricketer
 Frank B. Upham (1872–1939), U.S. Navy admiral
 George B. Upham (1768–1848), U.S. Representative from New Hampshire
 Jabez Upham (1764–1811), U.S. Representative from Massachusetts
 John Upham (born 1941), American baseball player
 Joshua Upham (1741–1808), American lawyer who became a judge and political figure in New Brunswick, Canada
 Misty Upham (1982–2014), Native American actress
 Nathaniel Gookin Upham (1801–1868), American jurist and president of the Concord and Montreal Railroad
 Nathaniel Upham (1774–1829), U.S. Representative from New Hampshire
 Oscar J. Upham (1871–1949), U.S. Marine, Medal of Honor recipient
 Richard Upham (1716 – c. 1775), political figure in Nova Scotia, Canada
 Samuel C. Upham (1819–1885), American journalist and counterfeiter of Confederate money
 Steadman Upham (1949-2017), American anthropologist, University of Tulsa president
 Thomas Cogswell Upham (1799–1872), American philosopher and educator
 Timothy Upham (1783–1855), American soldier in the War of 1812, subsequently collector of customs and politician
 Warren Upham (1850–1934), American geologist, archaeologist and librarian
 William Upham (1792–1853), U.S. Senator from Vermont
 William H. Upham (1841–1924), U.S. Army major, businessman and governor of Wisconsin

See also
 Upham (disambiguation)